US Legend Cars, formerly known as 600 Racing Inc. is an American race car constructor. The company, based in Harrisburg, North Carolina, builds all cars involved in Legends car racing.  US Legend Cars holds the title of largest race car manufacturer in the world, due to their high production volume.

History
US Legend Cars was launched by Charlotte Motor Speedway officials seeking a cheaper alternative to stock car racing. The target was a racing car low in purchasing price and in maintenance. The first car was unveiled in April 1992 by Charlotte Motor Speedway president Humpy Wheeler and former racer Elliott Forbes-Robinson. The first legends racing cars body styles were based on the stockcar modified divisions from the 1930s and 1940s. 

Wheeler and Forbes-Robinson based the legends cars on a Dwarf cars racing division based in Arizona. As Wheeler was the Charlotte Motor Speedway president and Speedway Motorsports president the new company developing the cars was introduced as a subsidiary to Speedway Motorsports. For 1993 a Legends racing series on road courses was introduced in the United Kingdom.

For 1998 a new car was introduced, the Bandolero model. The car was fitted with a 570cc Briggs & Stratton Vanguard Model 35 engine. In 2011 a new car was launched, the Dirt Modified. The car is similar to a regular Legends racing car. However a slightly different body and adjusted Bilstein shocks make it handle more like a midget car. Ray Evernham helped develop the new racing car. The first track to run the dirt car series was East Lincoln Speedway in Stanley, North Carolina.

The legend car engine was updated from a Yamaha 1250 to a Yamaha FZ-09 in the spring of 2018.

Models

References

External links
Car Dealers Information
Fastest Cars In The World
Otoloka - Car Information Site

Racing cars
Stock car racing series
American racecar constructors
Companies based in North Carolina
American companies established in 1992
Auto racing series in the United States
Stock car racing series in the United States